This is a list of regiments within the British Army's Royal Armoured Corps during the Second World War.

On the creation of the corps in 1939, just before the outbreak of the Second World War, it comprised those regular cavalry and Territorial Army Yeomanry regiments that had been mechanised, together with the Royal Tank Regiment. As the war progressed and further horsed regiments were mechanised, they joined the corps, together with new (armoured) cavalry regiments that were raised for the hostilities. The RAC created its own training and support regiments, and in 1941 and 1942 a number of infantry battalions were converted to armoured regiments and joined the RAC. Lastly, the RAC subsumed the Reconnaissance Corps in 1944.

In the list below, the date refers to the date when the regiment joined the RAC.

Cavalry

Regular
1939
1st King's Dragoon Guards
2nd Dragoon Guards (Queen's Bays)
3rd Carabiniers (Prince of Wales's Dragoon Guards)
4th/7th Royal Dragoon Guards
5th Royal Inniskilling Dragoon Guards
3rd The King's Own Hussars
4th Queen's Own Hussars
7th Queen's Own Hussars
8th King's Royal Irish Hussars
9th Queen's Royal Lancers
10th Royal Hussars (Prince of Wales's Own)
11th Hussars (Prince Albert's Own)
12th Royal Lancers (Prince of Wales's)
13th/18th Royal Hussars
14th/20th King's Hussars
15th/19th The King's Royal Hussars
16th/5th Lancers
17th/21st Lancers
3rd Cavalry Training Regiment – Edinburgh, closed 1940
4th Cavalry Training Regiment – Colchester, closed 1940
6th Cavalry Training Regiment – Maidstone, closed 1940

1940
1st The Royal Dragoons

1941
Royal Scots Greys

Hostilities-only
1940
22nd Dragoons
23rd Hussars
24th Lancers

1941
25th Dragoons
26th Hussars
27th Lancers

Special Reserve
1939
North Irish Horse

Yeomanry
1939
1st Derbyshire Yeomanry
2nd Derbyshire Yeomanry
1st Royal Gloucestershire Hussars
2nd Royal Gloucestershire Hussars
1st Lothians and Border Horse
2nd Lothians and Border Horse
1st Fife and Forfar Yeomanry
2nd Fife and Forfar Yeomanry
3rd County of London Yeomanry (Sharpshooters)
4th County of London Yeomanry (Sharpshooters)
1st Northamptonshire Yeomanry
2nd Northamptonshire Yeomanry
1st East Riding Yeomanry
2nd East Riding Yeomanry

1940
Inns of Court Regiment
Westminster Dragoons (2nd County of London Yeomanry)

1941
Royal Wiltshire Yeomanry
Warwickshire Yeomanry
Yorkshire Hussars
Sherwood Rangers Yeomanry
Staffordshire Yeomanry
Cheshire Yeomanry
North Somerset Yeomanry

1944
Queen's Own Yorkshire Dragoons

Royal Tank Regiment
Royal Tank Regiment nomenclature during the Second World War: the regiments were referred to as battalions and used Bn in the title. Post-war Bn was dropped and titles used Royal Tank Regiment without Bn.

Regular
1st Bn, Royal Tank Regiment
2nd Bn, Royal Tank Regiment
3rd Bn, Royal Tank Regiment
4th Bn, Royal Tank Regiment
5th Bn, Royal Tank Regiment
6th Bn, Royal Tank Regiment
7th Bn, Royal Tank Regiment
8th Bn, Royal Tank Regiment

Hostilities-only
9th Bn, Royal Tank Regiment
10th Bn, Royal Tank Regiment
11th Bn, Royal Tank Regiment
12th Bn, Royal Tank Regiment

Dummy tanks
The following "regiments" were formed to construct and move dummy tanks.  These were intended to deceive the enemy as to the disposition and strength of British armour.  The 3rd Royal Gloucestershire Hussars and the 4th Northamptonshire Yeomanry were formed in a similar manner.
37th Bn, Royal Tank Regiment (Dummy tanks)
38th Bn, Royal Tank Regiment (Dummy tanks)
39th Bn, Royal Tank Regiment (Dummy tanks)
60th Bn, Royal Tank Regiment (Dummy tanks)
62nd Bn, Royal Tank Regiment (Dummy tanks)
65th Bn, Royal Tank Regiment (Dummy tanks)
101st Bn, Royal Tank Regiment (Dummy tanks)
102nd Bn, Royal Tank Regiment (Dummy tanks)
118th Bn, Royal Tank Regiment (Dummy tanks)
124th Bn, Royal Tank Regiment (Dummy tanks)

Territorial
40th (The King's) Bn, Royal Tank Regiment converted from 7th Battalion, King's Regiment (Liverpool)
41st (Oldham) Bn, Royal Tank Regiment converted from 10th Battalion, Manchester Regiment
42nd Royal Tank Regiment (7th (23rd London) Battalion, East Surrey Regiment) Bn, Royal Tank Regiment converted from 7th Battalion, East Surrey Regiment
43rd Royal Tank Regiment (6th (City) Battalion, Royal Northumberland Fusiliers) Bn, Royal Tank Regiment converted from 6th Battalion, Royal Northumberland Fusiliers
44th Bn, Royal Tank Regiment converted from 6th Battalion, Gloucestershire Regiment
45th (Leeds Rifles) Bn, Royal Tank Regiment converted from 7th Battalion, West Yorkshire Regiment
46th (Liverpool Welsh) Bn, Royal Tank Regiment duplicate of 40th RTR
47th (Oldham) Bn, Royal Tank Regiment duplicate of 41st RTR
48th Bn, Royal Tank Regiment duplicate of 42nd RTR
49th Bn, Royal Tank Regiment duplicate of 43rd RTR
50th Bn, Royal Tank Regiment duplicate of 44th RTR
51st (Leeds Rifles) Bn, Royal Tank Regiment duplicate of 45th RTR

RAC regiments
1st Armoured Delivery Regiment RAC
1st Armoured Reinforcement Regiment RAC
2nd Armoured Delivery Regiment RAC
21st Training Regiment RAC – 1944–45
51st Training Regiment RAC – Cavalry Depot, Catterick, closed 1945
52nd Training Regiment RAC – RTR Depot, Bovington, closed 1945
53rd Training Regiment RAC – Tidworth, closed 1945
54th Training Regiment RAC – Perham Down (Barnard Castle from 1943)
55th Training Regiment RAC – Farnborough, closed 1945
56th Training Regiment RAC – Catterick, closed 1945
57th Training Regiment RAC – Warminster (Catterick from 1943)
58th (Young Soldiers) Training Regiment RAC – Bovington, closed 1945
59th Training Regiment RAC – Armoured Cars, Tidworth
60th Training Regiment RAC – Tidworth, closed 1945
61st Training Regiment RAC – Tidworth
62nd Training Regiment RAC – Recce Training Centre, Catterick
200th Armoured Delivery Regiment RAC

RAC regiments converted from infantry
All personnel in these units wore the black RAC beret with their own infantry regimental badge.

1941
107th Regiment RAC (King's Own) from 5th Battalion, King's Own Royal Regiment (Lancaster) 
108th Regiment RAC (Lancashire Fusiliers) from 1/5th Battalion, Lancashire Fusiliers 
109th Regiment RAC (Lancashire Fusiliers) from 1/6th Battalion, Lancashire Fusiliers
110th Regiment RAC (Border Regiment) from 5th Battalion, Border Regiment
111th Regiment RAC (Manchester Regiment) from 5th Battalion, Manchester Regiment
112th Regiment RAC (Foresters) from 9th Battalion, Sherwood Foresters – armoured cars
141st Regiment RAC from 7th Battalion, Buffs (Royal East Kent Regiment)
142nd (Suffolk) Regiment RAC from 7th Battalion, Suffolk Regiment
143rd Regiment RAC (Lancashire Fusiliers) from 9th Battalion, Lancashire Fusiliers
144th Regiment RAC from 8th Battalion, East Lancashire Regiment
145th Regiment RAC (8DWR) from 8th Battalion, Duke of Wellington's Regiment
146th Regiment RAC from 9th Battalion, Duke of Wellington's Regiment
147th Regiment RAC from 10th Battalion, Hampshire Regiment
148th Regiment RAC from 9th Battalion, Loyal Regiment (North Lancashire)
149th Regiment RAC from 7th Battalion, King's Own Yorkshire Light Infantry
150th Regiment RAC from 10th Battalion, York and Lancaster Regiment
151st Regiment RAC from 10th Battalion, King's Own Royal Regiment (Lancaster)
152nd Regiment RAC from 11th Battalion, King's Regiment (Liverpool)
153rd Regiment RAC from 8th Battalion, Essex Regiment

1942
113th Regiment RAC from 2/5th Battalion, West Yorkshire Regiment
114th Regiment RAC from 2/6th Battalion, Duke of Wellington's Regiment
115th Regiment RAC from 2/7th Battalion, Duke of Wellington's Regiment
116th Regiment RAC from 9th Battalion, Gordon Highlanders
154th Regiment RAC from 9th Battalion, North Staffordshire Regiment
155th Regiment RAC from 15th Battalion, Durham Light Infantry
156th Regiment RAC from 11th Battalion, Highland Light Infantry
157th Regiment RAC from 9th Battalion, Hampshire Regiment
158th Regiment RAC from 6th Battalion, South Wales Borderers
159th Regiment RAC from 10th Battalion, Gloucestershire Regiment
160th Regiment RAC from 9th Battalion, Royal Sussex Regiment
161st Regiment RAC from 12th Battalion, Green Howards
162nd Regiment RAC from 9th Battalion, Queen's Own Royal West Kent Regiment
163rd Regiment RAC from 13th Battalion, Sherwood Foresters

1943
1st Scorpion Regiment RAC (equipped with Scorpion flail tanks) converted from 41st Royal Tank Regiment; became 1st Assault (Engineer) Regiment, Royal Engineers 1944 and thus left the RAC.

1944
 49th Armoured Personnel Carrier Regiment (equipped with Kangaroo APCs) converted from 49th Royal Tank Regiment

Reconnaissance regiments

The Reconnaissance Regiments had mainly been formed in 1941–3 from infantry battalions and/or brigade anti-tank companies. They usually took their numbers from the infantry divisions in which they were formed, but retained them if transferred to another division. Some had been disbanded before transfer to the RAC in 1944, some had been converted from RAC regiments and consequently returned to the corps in 1944.

1st Reconnaissance Regiment RAC
2nd Reconnaissance Regiment RAC
3rd (Royal Northumberland Fusiliers) Reconnaissance Regiment RAC
4th Reconnaissance Regiment RAC
5th Reconnaissance Regiment RAC
15th (Scottish) Reconnaissance Regiment RAC
38th (Welsh) Reconnaissance Regiment RAC
43rd (Wessex) Reconnaissance Regiment (The Gloucestershire Regiment) RAC
44th Reconnaissance Regiment RAC
45th Reconnaissance Regiment RAC
46th Reconnaissance Regiment RAC
49th (West Riding) Reconnaissance Regiment RAC
52nd (Lowland) Reconnaissance Regiment RAC
53rd (Welsh) Reconnaissance Regiment RAC
54th Reconnaissance Regiment RAC
56th Reconnaissance Regiment RAC
59th Reconnaissance Regiment RAC
61st Reconnaissance Regiment RAC
63rd Reconnaissance Training Centre (became 62nd Training Regiment RAC)
80th Reconnaissance Regiment RAC (Holding and training regiment)
81st (West African) Reconnaissance Regiment RAC
82nd (West African) Reconnaissance Regiment RAC
161st (Green Howards) Reconnaissance Regiment RAC (converted from 161st Regiment RAC)
1st Airborne Reconnaissance Squadron
6th Airborne Armoured Reconnaissance Regiment RAC
2nd Derbyshire Yeomanry
GHQ Liaison Regiment (Phantom)

See also
 British armoured formations of the Second World War
 List of British mobile brigades during the Second World War

Notes

References

Bibliography

External links
 
 

Armoured regiments of the British Army in World War II
Lists of British Army units and formations
United Kingdom in World War II-related lists